is a 3D rail shooter arcade game that was released by Namco in 1986. It usurped both Libble Rabble and Toy Pop (the latter of which was released earlier in 1986) as the company's most powerful 8-bit arcade games, was the first game from them to use an analogue (360-degree) joystick. A stereoscopic 3-D sequel, 3-D Thunder Ceptor II, was released towards the end of the year.

Gameplay

The player must take control of the eponymous Thunder Ceptor, a hyper-way fighter ship developed by the Federal Troops, which is equipped with a rapid-fire zapper cannon, and rocket artillery napalm bombs – it can possess up to five of these bombs at a time, and they will be replenished at the end of each command. It also has a radar (which is displayed in the centre of the screen), and its progress ("WAY") is displayed up at the top of the screen, along with its energy ("POWER") and its bomb ("ARMS"). Its condition is also displayed in the top-left corner of the screen (usually with an image of its blueprints), but shall change to say "CAUTION" or "ENERGY EMPTY" when a formation attack is heading towards it or it is reduced to four bars of power.

Development and release
Thunder Ceptor was Namco's answer to Space Harrier, a similar arcade game published by rival Sega in 1985. It was one of Namco's most-powerful arcade games, posing custom DAC chips and a 12.2 MHz 68000 processor, the same one used in consoles like the Super Nintendo Entertainment System. The graphics were designed by Shigeki Toyama, an artist known for his work on games such as Xevious, Point Blank, and Galaxian3: Project Dragoon. Toyama made the graphics through a then-new pixel art program on a consumer-grade computer, which was written in BASIC. He also designed the arcade cabinet, which was a sit-down with a yoke controller and an accelerator pad. The game was published in July 1986.

Reception
In Japan, the arcade trade publication Game Machine listed Thunder Ceptor as being the fourth most popular arcade game of August 1986.

Retrospectively in 2013, Corwin Brence of Hardcore Gaming 101 described its gameplay as a combination of Xevious and Pole Position, and said it made for a unique 3D shooting game. While he said the gameplay wasn't anything amazing, Brence commended the game for its hardware capabilities, commenting on its 3D perspective, custom chips, and multitude of on-screen sprites with little slowdown. Brence expressed disappointment that the game was never included on any Namco video game collections or received any contemporary home releases, writing that: "Namco has also not bothered to include Thunder Ceptor on any of its Namco Museum series, deciding to focus instead on their pre-1985 hits like Pac-Man. Thunder Ceptor would remain lost for the years to come, except to a curious few with an emulator and an Internet connection".

Retro Gamer, who compared it to Space Harrier and Star Wars, argued that the game had little to offer that made it stand out from other 3D shooters. They complained that the graphics looked rushed and blocky, but that the 3D perspective was unique and done well. Ultimately, they stated that Thunder Ceptor wasn't as refined as Sega and Atari's games, and recommended that readers play those instead.

3-D Thunder Ceptor II
 is a sequel released in December 1986. Its arcade cabinet incorporates stereoscopic 3-D technology. The 3-D image is generated using LCD shutter glasses, which is enhanced by a fresnel lens placed between the video screen and shutter glasses, giving the impression of large 3-D images coming near the player. It followed on the heels of several stereoscopic 3-D arcade games released by rival companies Irem, Sega and Taito.

The game was commercially successful in Japan, where it was tied with Street Fighter as the fifth highest-grossing arcade game of 1987.

Notes

References

1986 video games
Arcade video games
Arcade-only video games
Bandai Namco Entertainment franchises
Namco arcade games
Shoot 'em ups
Video games developed in Japan